Perlerfiup Kangerlua (old spelling: Perdlerfiup Kangerdlua) is a fjord in Avannaata municipality in northwestern Greenland. It is a tributary fjord of the larger Uummannaq Fjord system.

Geography 

The fjord is bounded from the south by the Ukkusissat Peninsula across its entire length. To the north, it is bound by the mainland of Greenland, the highlands of Akularusersuaq and Akuliarusikassak, and the mountains of Perlerfiup Nunaa. The coastline is undeveloped−the fjord has only one tributary fjord on its northern bank, the Qaumarujuk Fjord.

Settlement 

Ukkusissat, perched on the northwestern tip of the Ukkusissat Peninsula at the mouth of the fjord, is the only settlement in the area.

Mining 

Maamorilik is a former mining site, currently undergoing reactivation, and slated for reopening in November 2010.

Transport 
The fjord can be reached by individually chartered boats from Ukkusissat. Ukkusissat Heliport served by Air Greenland is the only aerodrome in the area, with twice-weekly connections to Uummannaq.

References 

Fjords of Greenland
Uummannaq Fjord